Fábio Ramos Magalhães (born 12 March 1988) is a Portuguese handball player for FC Porto and the Portuguese national team.

He represented Portugal at the 2020 European Men's Handball Championship.

References

External links

1988 births
Living people
Portuguese male handball players
Sportspeople from Lisbon
FC Porto handball players
Sporting CP handball players
Handball players at the 2020 Summer Olympics